Aegiroessa or Aigiroessa was a city of ancient Aeolis, which Herodotus enumerates among the 11 cities of Aeolis; but nothing more is known of it.

The site of Aegiroessa is unlocated.

References

Populated places in ancient Aeolis
Former populated places in Turkey
Lost ancient cities and towns